Coelotrypes is a genus of tephritid  or fruit flies in the family Tephritidae.

Species accepted within the genus include:

 Coelotrypes circumscriptus (Hering, 1941)
 Coelotrypes fasciolatus (Loew, 1863)
 Coelotrypes flavina (Hering, 1941)
 Coelotrypes hammersteini (Enderlein, 1911)
 Coelotrypes inumbratus (Munro, 1957)
 Coelotrypes latilimbata (Enderlein, 1911)
 Coelotrypes major (Bezzi, 1924)
 Coelotrypes nigricornutus Hering, 1942
 Coelotrypes nigriventris Bezzi, 1924
 Coelotrypes pallidus Bezzi, 1924
 Coelotrypes pulchellinus (Hering, 1940)
 Coelotrypes pulchellus (Bezzi, 1920)
 Coelotrypes punctilabris (Bezzi, 1928)
 Coelotrypes ripleyi Munro, 1933
 Coelotrypes simplex (Bezzi, 1924)
 Coelotrypes vittatus Bezzi, 1923

References

Trypetinae
Tephritidae genera